This is a list of the extreme points of Portugal, indicating the location of the most distant or highest points in continental or national limits of Portugal:

Portugal
 Northernmost point — village of Cevide, civil parish of Cristoval, municipality of Melgaço;
 Southernmost point — Ilhéu de Fora, Savage Islands, municipality of Funchal (Madeira);
 Westernmost point — Ilhéu do Monchique, Fajã Grande, municipality of Lajes das Flores, Flores (Azores), also considered the westernmost point of Europe;
 Easternmost point — Ifanes e Paradela, municipality of Miranda do Douro;
 Centermost — Penhascoso, Portugal, Municipality in Portugal

Continental Portugal

This subsection details the extreme points in continental Portugal:

 Northernmost point — village of Cevide (42.154058, -8.198415), civil parish of Cristoval, municipality of Melgaço;
 Southernmost point — Cabo de Santa Maria (36.960158, -7.887096), civil parish of Sé, municipality of Faro;
 Westernmost point — Cabo da Roca (38.780963, -9.500552), civil parish of Colares, municipality of Sintra, also the westernmost point of continental Europe;
 Easternmost point — Ifanes e Paradela (41.574886, -6.190217), municipality of Miranda do Douro;
 Centermost — Penhascoso, Portugal (39.5571,-8.04276), Municipality in Portugal

See also
 Geography of Portugal
 Extreme points of Earth

Extreme
Portugal